Sony Aliber or Soni Ali Ber is a commune in the Cercle of Gao in the Gao Region of south-eastern Mali. The main villages are: Bagnadji, Batal, Berrah, Forgho Arma, Forgho Songhai, Kochakarey, Kokorom, Magnadoué, Seina and Zindiga. The administrative center (Chef-lieu) is the village of Forgo Sourhai which is located 25 km north of Gao. The commune includes the banks of the River Niger for a distance of around 35 km. In the 2009 census the commune had a population of 44,099.

References

Communes of Gao Region